This is a list of animals that have hard permanent pointed projections on their head.

Horns 
Horns are projections from the top of the head. True horns are found mainly among:

 Ruminant artiodactyls,
 in the families Antilocapridae (pronghorn) and
 Bovidae (cattle, goats, antelope etc.).
 Giraffidae: Giraffes have one or more pairs of bony bumps on their heads, called ossicones.
 Cervidae: Most deer have antlers, which are not true horns and made of bone. When fully developed, antlers are dead bone.
 Rhinocerotidae: The "horns" of rhinoceroses are made of keratin, the same substance as fingernails.

Tusks 
Tusks are pointed projections from the lower part of the head.

 Elephant
 Walrus
 Warthog
 Narwhal

Lists of animals